Christine Langan (born January 1965) is an English film producer who was appointed Head of BBC Films in 2009. In 2016, she left the role to become CEO of comedy television production company Baby Cow Productions.

After graduating from Cambridge University in 1987 and working in advertising for three years, Langan joined Granada Television's drama serials department where she script edited daytime soap operas. From there, she transferred to Granada's newly created comedy department, where she developed the acclaimed television series Cold Feet, and other one-off comedies. In 2000, she left Granada to become a freelance producer, and produced the romantic comedy series Rescue Me for the BBC. She returned to Granada in 2002, where she produced the acclaimed dramas The Deal (2003) and Dirty Filthy Love (2004). She made her feature film production debut on Pierrepoint (2005), which got her a Carl Foreman Award nomination at the 60th British Academy Film Awards. Langan also produced The Queen (2006) for Granada, which won the BAFTA Award for Best Film and was nominated for the Academy Award for Best Picture.

In 2006, Langan became an executive producer at BBC Films, developing features such as The Other Boleyn Girl (2008) and The Duchess (2008). In April 2009, she was appointed Creative Director of BBC Films, giving her control of a £12 million annual budget and which projects are commissioned for development. By 2010, Langan had led BBC Films to a record 13 nominations at the British Academy Film Awards, which included In the Loop (2009), Fish Tank (2009) and An Education (2009).

Langan lives in London with her partner, writer Christian Spurrier, and their two children.

Background
Christine Langan was born in January 1965 in Edmonton, London, England. Her mother and father, a dinner lady and a bricklayer respectively, already had three children. Growing up, Langan became interested in television production after seeing Lew Grade's name in the credits of several programmes. She attended a Catholic grammar school and read English at Gonville and Caius College, Cambridge.

After graduating from Cambridge University in 1987, Langan spent three years working as a copywriter for an advertising company. She also contributed film reviews to BBC Radio 2's Cinema 2 programme. In 1990, Langan began her career in film production as an assistant developer for Tessa Ross at British Screen. The following year, she responded to an advertisement for a script editor at Granada Television's drama serials department, located in Manchester. She was hired by David Liddiment, and worked mainly on Granada's daytime soap operas.

Career

Granada comedy
In 1993, Langan returned to London to work for Andy Harries at Granada's newly created comedy department, where she script-edited September Song, the television adaptation of An Evening with Gary Lineker, and the second series of Rik Mayall Presents. In 1995, she was associate producer on The Perfect Match, a one-off comedy drama written by former BBC radio producer Mike Bullen. The Perfect Match was broadcast in September 1995, and shortly afterwards, Harries asked Langan to develop more ideas from Bullen.

They devised Cold Feet, another one-off comedy drama based on the love lives of Bullen himself and his friends. Langan produced Cold Feet, guiding Bullen through his script drafts, and hiring Father Ted director Declan Lowney to shoot it. Cold Feet was broadcast in March 1997 as one of four Comedy Premieres on ITV (two others of which Langan script edited). It received poor ratings and little critical reaction. However, in May 1997, it won the Rose d'Or at the Montreux International Television Festival. ITV Network Centre commissioned a series of Cold Feet in August, which Langan also produced. For the series, Langan tried to achieve a written and visual style that differed from regular sitcoms by avoiding "one-liners and quick laughs" and hiring directors who had done little television work before. Cold Feet premiered as a series in November 1998, and Langan stayed until the third series in 2000. She and Bullen received a nomination for the British Academy Television Award for Best Drama Series in 2000. Also in 1998, Langan worked on her first feature film, script editing the Parker Posey-led The Misadventures of Margaret.

In 1999, Langan was made an executive producer in the department. She oversaw several productions, including Passion Killers (1999, starring Ben Miller), Safe as Houses (2000, starring Ricky Tomlinson), and the pilot episode of David Nicholls' I Saw You (2000, starring Paul Rhys and Fay Ripley). In 2000, Langan was offered a position at the BBC's drama department, which had been rearranged that year. The trade magazine Broadcast reported the BBC had made a "substantial offer" to her. Granada's director of programmes Grant Mansfield countered the BBC's bid by offering Langan the position of deputy controller of drama, operating under Andy Harries, who had recently been appointed controller of the same department. Langan accepted neither offer, and instead became a freelance producer after her contract with Granada expired.

As a freelancer, Langan developed three more episodes of I Saw You for Granada. Her only other project was producing David Nicholls' romantic comedy series Rescue Me with Tiger Aspect Productions for BBC One. As well as producing it, she made her credited directorial debut on the final episode. The six-part series, starring Sally Phillips, was broadcast in 2002. It was not a ratings success, and the BBC did not commission a second series.

Granada drama
In September 2002, Langan signed a new contract to develop new projects at Granada's combined drama, film and comedy department. Her first production was the romantic comedy television film Watermelon, starring Anna Friel. At the end of 2002, she began developing Peter Morgan's The Deal, a dramatisation of the political rise of Tony Blair and Gordon Brown. Although initially giving full backing, the ITV network backed out during pre-production. Channel 4 picked up the film from Granada, and it was broadcast in September 2003. The Deal was presented with the British Academy Television Award for Best Single Drama in 2004. The same year, she produced the one-off drama Dirty Filthy Love, which was also nominated for the BAFTA for Best Single Drama.

In 2005, Langan's feature debut Pierrepoint was released at major film festivals. Based on the life of British hangman Albert Pierrepoint (played by Timothy Spall), Pierrepoint got Langan a nomination for the Carl Foreman Award for Most Promising Newcomer at the 60th British Academy Film Awards in 2007. 2006 saw the theatrical release of The Queen, a feature film follow-up to The Deal, that focused on the impact the death of Diana, Princess of Wales had on Tony Blair and Queen Elizabeth II. Michael Sheen reprised his role as Tony Blair from The Deal, and Helen Mirren played Elizabeth. The film was produced by Granada in co-operation with the ITV network, and was released in late 2006 to critical acclaim. In 2007, it won the BAFTA Award for Best Film and was nominated for the Academy Award for Best Picture. Of Langan's work on Pierrepoint and The Queen, a Variety writer said, "both pics are a tribute to her tactful skill at working with tricky but talented writers and directors to take stories that could easily have been confined to the small screen and give them real cinematic depth and breadth".

BBC Films
In September 2006, Langan made a low-key departure from Granada to take up a position as an executive producer with BBC Films. Although approached to join BBC Films some years before, only in 2007 did she feel it was the time to "concentrate more exclusively on film". She immediately began overseeing editing work on The Other Boleyn Girl, which was already in post-production. She also began developing The Damned United, a film based on David Peace's novel that fictionalised the 44 days Brian Clough managed Leeds United F.C. in 1974. The film was adapted by Peter Morgan, executive produced by Andy Harries, and starred Michael Sheen as Clough. On why she continues to work with the same people on her projects, Langan said, "The reason I return to working with the same people is that you have invested time, energy and thought and care into these relationships and that can pay dividends—The Queen is an example of those relationships paying dividends".

Following David M. Thompson's announcement that he would be retiring from the post of head of BBC Films in September 2007, Langan was widely expected to take over his duties. Confirmation was made the following month when she was appointed Commissioning Editor of the company, taking over the day-to-day duties of BBC Films and reporting to Jane Tranter, the Controller of Fiction at the BBC. When Tranter transferred to a BBC Worldwide position in Los Angeles in 2009, the BBC decided not to fill the Controller of Fiction vacancy with a single person. Instead, the responsibilities were divided between four people; Langan became Creative Director of BBC Films, responsible for "editorial strategy and commissioning", and also joined the BBC Fiction board.

By 2010, Langan was overseeing a £12 million annual budget at BBC Films, and had executive produced high-profile films such as In the Loop (Armando Iannucci, 2009), Fish Tank (Andrea Arnold, 2009), and An Education (Lone Scherfig, 2009). BBC Films received 13 nomination at the 63rd British Academy Film Awards, described in the London Evening Standard as a record number. In 2010, Langan also executive produced The Special Relationship—the final part of Peter Morgan's "Blair trilogy"—and StreetDance, the first British feature film to be made in 3D. The Guardian recognised Langan's achievements at BBC Films by ranking her at number 36 in its inaugural Film Power 100 list in September 2010.

Through 2011, Langan executive produced Ralph Fiennes' directorial debut Coriolanus, the Marilyn Monroe biopic My Week with Marilyn, and Lynne Ramsay's adaptation of Lionel Shriver's novel We Need to Talk About Kevin. The project was in development hell since 2007 until Langan realised BBC Films was trying to get too big a budget to make it with. Ramsay rewrote the script in 2010 to allow a lower budget.

Filmography

Awards and nominations

Langan was made Honorary Associate of London Film School.

References

Further reading
BBC Press Office (March 2010). "Christine Langan biography ". Press release. Retrieved on 30 August 2010.
Entries by Christine Langan on About the BBC Blog. Retrieved on 30 August 2010.
Neilan, Catherine (28 October 2010). "Made In... Shepherds Bush". Broadcast (Emap). Retrieved on 28 October 2010.

External links
Christine Langan at United Agents
Christine Langan at the British Film Institute

1965 births
Alumni of Gonville and Caius College, Cambridge
Filmmakers who won the Best Film BAFTA Award
BBC executives
English film producers
English television directors
English television producers
British women television producers
ITV people
Living people
Businesspeople from London
British women television directors